Clinton E. Frank (September 13, 1915 – July 7, 1992) was an American football player and advertising executive. He played halfback for Yale University, where he won both the Heisman Trophy and Maxwell Award in 1937.  In 1954, he founded the Clinton E. Frank, Inc. advertising agency.

Early life and football career
Frank attended Evanston Township High School in Evanston, Illinois, where he obtained notoriety as a superb football player.  He then attended Lawrenceville School as a post-graduate student.

Frank attended Yale College, where he was a member of Skull and Bones, and graduated with a degree in economics in 1938.  In football, he was a two-time team captain and All-American, and as a senior in 1937, he won the Heisman Trophy and the Maxwell Award.  He beat out Byron "Whizzer" White for the Heisman Trophy; White later became a justice of the U.S. Supreme Court. Frank also received the Maxwell Award after his senior year in which he scored three touchdowns in his team`s 19–0 victory over Brown.

Frank was drafted in the 12th round of the 1938 NFL Draft by the Detroit Lions, but he did not sign; he never played professional football.

Frank was married to Margaret Rathje Frank, with whom he had three sons and six daughters.

Military service
Clint Frank attained the rank of lieutenant colonel in the Army Air Corps, serving as an aide to General Jimmy Doolittle during World War II.  Following the war he resumed his career in advertising.

Advertising career
Frank joined the Chicago advertising firm of Blackett-Sample-Hummert Inc., where he was employed for ten years before being promoted to advertising manager of E.J. Brach and Sons, the famed candy producer.  Frank became a full partner in the advertising agency of Price, Robinson and Frank.  He was able to transition this agency into his own with him as owner and president.  In 1954 Frank established Clinton E. Frank Inc., a Chicago based advertising agency which was sold to Campbell-Ewald Co. of Detroit in 1976.

Braniff Airways account
One of Clinton E. Frank Agency's most memorable clients was the flashy Dallas-based Braniff International Airways.  Frank obtained the account in 1969 from famed advertising executive George Lois.  The Frank Agency created the "El Clan, Braniff" advertising scheme for Braniff's growing South American Route System.  They also created the highly unique Braniff "You'll Like Flying Braniff Style" Campaign.  Both campaigns came complete with musical jingles which were debuted in 1971.

Memberships
 Baxter Travenol Laboratories, Inc., Board Member
 Passavant Memorial Hospital, Director
 Northwestern University Hospital, Director
 Chicago Symphony Orchestra, Governing Member
 Yale Club of Chicago, Member
 American Association of Advertising, President
 Chicago Advertising Club, President
 Illinois Racing Board, Board Member

Honors
 Heisman Trophy, 1937
 Maxwell Award, 1937
 All American Quarterback and captain, two time recipient, 1937
 Good Shepherd Award from Lambs Farm

Retirement and death
Frank founded the Brain Research Foundation at the University of Chicago and the Eye Research Institute in Boston.  He also founded the American Academy of Arts during his retirement.

Frank died at Evanston Hospital in Evanston, Illinois after a brief illness.

References

External links
 
 

1915 births
1992 deaths
American advertising executives
American football halfbacks
Yale Bulldogs football players
All-American college football players
College Football Hall of Fame inductees
Heisman Trophy winners
Maxwell Award winners
United States Army Air Forces personnel of World War II
United States Army Air Forces officers
Braniff
Evanston Township High School alumni
Lawrenceville School alumni
Sportspeople from Evanston, Illinois
Players of American football from Illinois
20th-century American businesspeople
Yale College alumni
United States Army colonels
Military personnel from Illinois